The 2011 Cal Poly Mustangs football team represented California Polytechnic State University in the 2011 NCAA Division I FCS football season. The team's head coach was Tim Walsh. The Mustangs played their home games at Alex G. Spanos Stadium in San Luis Obispo, California and were football members of the Great West Conference.

With a win over South Dakota on October 29, the Mustangs clinched a share of the conference championship which they shared with North Dakota. The title was Cal Poly's fourth conference title since the conference's creation in 2004. They finished the season with an overall record of 6–5, 3–1 in Great West play.

This was the Mustangs final season as a member of the Great West as they became a football-only member of the Big Sky Conference in the 2012 season.

Schedule

Game summaries

See also
 2011 NCAA Division I FCS football rankings

References

Cal Poly
Cal Poly Mustangs football seasons
Great West Conference football champion seasons
Cal Poly Mustangs football